Fitzroy Provincial Park is a provincial park on the Ottawa River in Ontario, Canada, designated as recreational-class by Ontario Parks. White pine covers much of the park. The park has century-old trees and a stand of 300-year-old bur oaks by the Carp River. There are two campgrounds within the park, both with comfort stations, a boat launch and park store. The main campgrounds have 235 campsites, 107 with electrical service, 205 with room for trailers, and a separate area with facilities for group camping and picnicking.

Cross-country skiing is available in the winter on trails maintained by the West Carleton Nordic Ski Club.

See also
List of Ontario parks

References

External links

Fitzroy Provincial Park, Ontario Trails Council

Provincial parks of Ontario
Parks in Ottawa
Year of establishment missing